Komaraju Lanka is a village in Ravulapalem Mandal, Dr. B.R. Ambedkar Konaseema district in the state of Andhra Pradesh in India.

Geography 

Demographics 
 India census, Komaraju Lanka had a population of 5667, out of which 2875 were male and 2792 were female. The population of children below 6 years of age was 10%. The literacy rate of the village was 73%.

References 

Villages in Ravulapalem mandal